Jarabe tapatío, often referred to as the Mexican hat dance, is the national dance of Mexico. It originated as a courtship dance in Guadalajara, Jalisco, during the 19th century, although its elements can be traced back to the Spanish zambra and jarabe gitano, which were popular during the times of the viceroyalty. Female dancers traditionally wear a china poblana outfit, while the male dancers dress as charros.

The standard music of the jarabe tapatío was composed by Jesús González Rubio in the 19th century. However, its more common instrumental arrangement dates from the 1920s. Sometimes it is confused with La Raspa, another Mexican dance. Nowadays, its music is most commonly performed by either mariachi groups or string ensembles.

History

The word jarabe (from Arabic xarab), originally meaning "herb mixture", denotes the combination of various Mexican musics (sones) and dances (zapateados). Tapatío, the popular demonym of the city of Guadalajara, reflects the origin of this particular jarabe.  A number of other dances known as jarabes are known to have existed in the 18th and 19th centuries, such as the jarabe de Jalisco, the jarabe de atole and the jarabe moreliano, but the tapatío version is by far the best known. There is some dispute as to the jarabe tapatío'''s authenticity as folk dance. Music researcher Nicolás Puentes Macías from Zacatecas states that true jarabes are almost extinct in Mexico, found today only in small fractions of Zacatecas and Jalisco, and that the jarabe tapatío is really a form of a dance called "tonadilla".

The earliest evidence of the dance comes from the late 18th century. It was originally danced by female couples in order to avoid the disapproval of the church. Shortly before the Mexican War of Independence, mixed couples began to perform it, with a public performance at the Coliseo Theater in 1790 in Mexico City. Shortly after that performance, the jarabe was banned by colonial and religious authorities as it was considered to be morally offensive and a challenge to Spain's control over the territory. However, this only served to make the dance more popular as a form of protest and rebellion, with people holding illegal dances in public squares and neighborhood festivals.

Just after Independence, the jarabe and other dances grew and spread in popularity even more, with colonial-era restrictions lifted. People celebrated the end of the war in 1821 with large fiestas, which prominently featured the jarabe. Jarabe and other folk dances came to be seen as part of Mexico's emerging identity as a country. The jarabe would maintain various regional forms, but that associated with Guadalajara gained national status, becoming not only popular in that city but also in Mexico City as well, as a dance for the elite around the 1860s. Around the same time, Guadalajara music professor Jesús González Rubio composed a standard melody for it as a symbol of national unity, leading the dance to become the "national dance" of Mexico and the melody to gain wide popular recognition. By the Mexican Revolution, it had become popular with the lower classes as well. It became internationally famous after Russian dancer Anna Pavlova added it to her permanent repertoire after visiting Mexico in 1919.

The jarabe remained in vogue in Mexico until about 1930, especially in Mexico City. It remains taught in nearly every grade school in Mexico.

Performance

The dance represents the courtship of a man and a woman, with the woman first rejecting the man's advances, then eventually accepting them. It has a definite sexual component in metaphor, which was the original reason for disapproval by authorities.

As the dance has lost its controversial status and gained status as a representative of Mexico, the dancers have come to wear garb that is also highly representative of Mexican women and men. For women, the most traditional outfit is called the "China Poblana." The blouse and skirt combination is named after a woman from India who came to Mexico on the Manila Galleon to work as a servant in the early 19th century. Her Asian dress was copied and then adapted in the State of Puebla, with the skirt now heavily embroidered and otherwise decorated with patriotic images. The traditional outfit for men is that of the charro, generally heavily decorated in silver trim.

The music played to accompany the dance was written to be danced to and its played either by mariachi bands or by bands playing only string instruments such as various types of guitars, harps and violin.

Contemporary adaptations
The popularity of the composition by Jesús González Rubio has led it to be used in many forms of media. For example, in The Simpsons TV series it is used to reference the Bumblebee Man, a stereotypical Mexican character. In the United Kingdom, the tune was used in adverts for Morrisons, primarily in the 1980s and 1990s,  and some adverts in the mid-2000s. The supermarket's slogan and jingle at that time, 'More reasons to shop at Morrisons', had its tune derived from the jarabe's melody, which was used in all adverts in these eras. The tune is also known to be popularly used for Yakko's World, a song from Animaniacs in which the character list countries of the world from the early 1990s.

A jarabe also appears in Aaron Copland's ballet Billy the Kid'', played in  time, the tune on a solo trumpet (with orchestral accompaniment).

References

National symbols of Mexico
Spanish-language songs
Mexican music
Latin American folk dances